The Sameer Group of Companies, commonly referred to as the Sameer Group, is a large conglomerate, based in Kenya, with operations and subsidiaries in neighboring African countries.

Overview
The group is involved in industries including:  agriculture, manufacturing, distribution, high-tech, construction, transport and finance.  The company's offices are located in Nairobi, the capital city of Kenya, and the largest metropolitan area in that country. The shares of stock of some of the group's subsidiaries are listed on the Nairobi Stock Exchange.

Subsidiary companies
, the Sameer Group subsidiaries include, but are not limited to the following companies:
Sasini Tea & Coffee, Nairobi, Kenya 
Sameer Agriculture & Livestock Limited, Kampala, Uganda - Dairy Processing (Sold to Brookside Dairies in May 2015).
Sameer Industrial Park Limited, Nairobi, Kenya 
Sameer Business Park Limited, Nairobi, Kenya
Sameer Africa Limited, Nairobi, Kenya - Manufacture of tires. Formerly "Firestone East Africa Limited
Ryce East Africa Limited, Nairobi, Kenya
Yansam Motors Limited, Nairobi, Kenya
Swift Global Kenya Limited, Nairobi, Kenya 
Kenya Data Networks Limited, Nairobi, Kenya - Information Technology Company
Infocom Limited, Kampala, Uganda - Internet Service Provider 
Eveready East Africa Limited, Nairobi, Kenya - Manufacture of batteries
Ryce East Africa - Engineering Division, Nairobi, Kenya
Equatorial Commercial Bank, Nairobi, Kenya 
Equatorial Investment Bank Limited, Nairobi, Kenya
Savanna Coffee Lounge, Nairobi, Kenya
VLCC East Africa, a joint venture with VLCC of India, specialized in healthcare, fitness and wellness.

See also
Economy of Kenya
List of conglomerates in Africa

References

External links
 Website of Sameer Group

Companies based in Nairobi
Conglomerate companies of Kenya